Vienna is a song from Billy Joel's 1977 album The Stranger, released as the B-side to his "Just the Way You Are" single.

Despite its initial release as a B-side, the song's popularity has grown considerably in the decades after its release. , it is one of Joel's most-streamed songs on Spotify.

Composition
The song begins with a piano melody in the right hand and chords in the left, ultimately cadencing to the tonic chord of Bb. However, when the verse starts the first chord is a Gm, which is the relative minor chord of Bb. A change to the vi chord doesn't always indicate a change in key, however each verse ends with a V-i authentic cadence in Gm, indicating that a key change has taken place. The chorus begins with an Eb chord, the IV chord in Bb, which is a half step up from D, giving a rising feeling going from the verse to the chorus. The end of the chorus cadences back to the tonic of Bb with the chords C, Gb, F, Bb. Gb is the tritone substitution of the V chord for F, and F to Bb forms another authentic cadence. 

Lyrically, Joel was inspired by visiting the city of Vienna and his father, who left the family when Joel was a child. Joel has stated that Vienna is a metaphor for old age, but also may have been subconsciously about his father. Speaking more broadly about the song's message, he said in a 2008 interview that it conveys "you don't have to squeeze your whole life into your 20s and 30s trying to make it, trying to achieve that American dream, getting in the rat race and killing yourself. You have a whole life to live. I kind of used 'Vienna' as a metaphor, there is a reason for being old, a purpose". He also said: "We treat old people in this country pretty badly. We put them in rest homes, we kinda kick them under the rug and make believe they don’t exist. They [the people in Vienna] don’t feel like that. In a lot of these older places in the world, they value their older people and their older people feel they can still be a part of the community and I thought 'This is a terrific idea' – that old people are useful – and that means I don’t have to worry so much about getting old because I can still have a use in this world in my old age. I thought 'Vienna waits for you…'"

Certifications

Reception and legacy
It was played in a 1981 episode of Taxi called "Vienna Waits". Marilu Henner's character Elaine Nardo refers to the song while on vacation in Europe with Alex Reiger, played by Judd Hirsch. Due to licensing restrictions, the song has been omitted from the episode on DVD, though is intact on the Hulu versions of the episode.

In a July 2008 New York Times article, Joel cited this as one of his two favorite songs, along with "Summer, Highland Falls".

Writing in 2022, Tim Grierson of MEL Magazine attributed the song's endurance to it being featured in the 2004 film 13 Going on 30, prominence on social media platforms like Twitter and TikTok through the early 2020s, and its messaging, leading to a popularity that he identifies as particularly strong among younger people. He further wrote, "unlike something like 'Piano Man,' it hasn’t been shoved down our throats for the entirety of our lives. 'Vienna' feels like something you get to discover on your own and then claim for yourself".

PopMatters critic David Pike rated it one of the "41 essential pop/rock songs with accordion."

Cover versions
 In 2011, American singer Ariana Grande covered the song, initially sending the MP3 to her fans if they donated to her 2011 Tōhoku earthquake and tsunami appeal, and then later making it available to the public via her YouTube channel.
 In 2012, American Idol contestant Elise Testone performed the song on the 11th season of the show the week the contestants sang Billy Joel's songs.
 In 2013, Christian Borle performed it in "The Phenomenon", the 14th episode of the second season of Smash.
 In 2015, the Austrian band Granada released their version, "Wien wort auf di", sung in an Austrian dialect of German.
 In 2015, Mac Miller covered the song under his alias Larry Fisherman.
 In 2016, contestant Andrew DeMuro performed the song at the Blind Auditions on The Voice of the show and was made a part of Adam Levine's team.
 In 2019, Grace VanderWaal performed Vienna during her "Ur So Beautiful" tour.
 In 2019, Israeli singer Roie Labes released his version for the song in Hebrew, named "וינה".
 In 2019, actor Ben Platt performed the song in the eighth episode of the first season of The Politician. The song appeared on the soundtrack for the show as well.
 In 2021, Norwegian singer Anne Charlotte performed the song as the opening act of the annual Gullbarbie-concert.
 In 2022, Australian singer Gretta Ray released the song on TikTok, becoming a viral sensation. A recorded version was released 6 May 2022.

References

1977 songs
Billy Joel songs
Ben Platt songs
Song recordings produced by Phil Ramone
Songs about old age
Songs about Vienna
Songs written by Billy Joel
Columbia Records singles